Theodor Cazaban (2 April 1921 – 4 March 2016) was a Romanian anti-communist writer. 

Born in Fălticeni, he graduated from the University of Bucharest with a degree in letters, and fled to France in 1947. While in Paris, he was a staff member of the anti-communist newspaper 'La Nation Roumaine' and contributed to the broadcasts of Radio Free Europe. In 1963 he published the novel Parages, in which he describes Communist persecutions of Romanian intellectuals, such as Mircea Eliade, Emil Cioran, Eugène Ionesco, and others.

Marilena Rotaru of the Romanian Television made a documentary movie in 2003 about Theodor Cazaban.

Works
 Captiv în lumea liberă, Editura Echinox, Cluj, 2002. 
 Eseuri și cronici literare, Editura "Jurnalul literar", București, 2002. , .
 Parages, Éditions Gallimard, Paris, 1963 (in French)

References

External links 
 Ne lipsește Theodor Cazaban | Istoriile lui Alex. Ștefănescu, 10 august 2016, Alex Ștefănescu, Evenimentul Zilei

Interviews
 Theodor Cazaban: "În Scânteia erau asemenea minciuni, încît mi s-a părut un ziar mai mult decît suprarealist", Cristian Bădiliță, România Literară - anul 2000, numărul 51-52 - Archive memoria.ro

1921 births
2016 deaths
People from Fălticeni
Romanian journalists
Romanian writers
Romanian anti-communists
Romanian expatriates in France
Radio Free Europe/Radio Liberty people